Mister Bones (Robert Todd) is a character in the , created by Roy Thomas, Dann Thomas, and Todd McFarlane, in Infinity, Inc. #16 (July 1985). A former low-level supervillain and member of Helix, he reformed and joined the Infinity Inc. team, then later the Department of Extranormal Operations (a government agency which regulates superhero activity) as a bureaucrat, eventually rising to the rank of Regional Director for the Eastern Seaboard. Thus, he now wears a suit and tie instead of a costume, and is also known as Director Bones. A chain-smoker, he had a habit of speaking in rhyme in early appearances, but he no longer does so.

Keith David provides the voice of Mister Bones in Stargirl.

Fictional character biography

Origin
Dr. Benjamin (also known as Amos) Love, a gynecologist, injected six pregnant women with an experimental mutagenic drug. Each of the women gave birth to a metahuman child. Dr. Love kidnapped the infants and raised them himself, never allowing them to leave the house. The children learned all they knew from books, radio, and television. Later, the six young adults learned the true story of their origin from reading Love's diary and confronted him. They decided to execute him for what he did to them and Bones took Dr. Love out in the desert alone to kill him with his cyanide touch; the doctor begged for his life and Bones felt pity for him and let him go. Bones later showed the rest of his "family" the grave of Doctor Love. After the supposed death of Doctor Love and taking their cue from the superheroes they had watched on television, the six created costumes to go with the names Doctor Love had given them and called their group Helix with them taking on names like Penny Dreadful, Tao Jones, Kritter, Baby Boom, and Arak Wind-Walker.

Working with Helix
The team kidnapped the Infinitor Fury in an attempt to extort money. Although they were defeated by Fury's teammates, Infinity, Inc., Helix managed to escape. Later, the second Wildcat (Yolanda Montez) learned that she was in fact a cousin of Helix's new member Carcharo and that they are both products of the same genetic experiments as Helix. The two teams battled to a stalemate and Mr. Bones was arrested while the others escaped. Later, Mr. Bones was freed from prison by Doctor Love.

Carcharo soon turned on the Helix and kidnapped Mr. Bones. In the ensuing struggle Carcharo is stabbed with a long piece of metal and in a last-ditch effort bit Bones' leg off, and then died from cyanide poisoning. To make sure Bones got medical care, Helix turned themselves in to the authorities. Mr. Bones received an artificial leg and Dr. Beth Chapel (Doctor Midnight) helped him recover from his injuries, and the two formed a friendly relationship.

Working with Infinity, Inc.
Since they were minors, an informal court hearing was held to determine the fate of the members of Helix. It was found that Mr. Bones had too much of a negative influence on them. Infinity, Inc. was given custody of Bones while the rest of the Helix would receive treatment.

For most of his time with Infinity, Inc. Mr. Bones was not a member of the team even though he took an active part in their adventures and became a hero in his own right, and was eventually accepted by most of the Infinitors. During the wedding of Hector and Lyta Hall, Harlequin (Marcie Cooper) used deception to have Bones and Skyman meet at Solomon Grundy's room. She then deceived Solomon Grundy into grabbing Bones' arm and using him to kill Skyman with his cyanide touch.

Wracked with guilt, Bones left Infinity, Inc. When Dr. Love gained control of Helix and ordered them to kill Bones, Helix instead turned on Love, killing him. Helix then left in disgust, telling Bones he was no longer one of them. The Infinitors, though, granted Bones full membership in the team, but Bones' role in Skyman's death would end up being instrumental in their disbanding soon afterward.

Running the Department of Extranormal Operations
At some point after Infinity, Inc. disbanded, Mr. Bones became Director of a local branch of the U.S. Department of Extranormal Operations (D.E.O.), and as a D.E.O., Director Bones has had numerous interactions with the operations of the superhuman community. He has at times asked various DCU teams for their covert assistance. Notably, he has worked with the Justice Society of America a few times, to the point that Mister Terrific infiltrated the D.E.O. headquarters to tell Mr. Bones to stop harassing them. Bones was also wary of Atom Smasher, his old fellow Infinitor, after his murder of Extant. Mr. Bones became a supporting character in Manhunter.

Mr. Bones and the operations of the D.E.O. are featured in the DC Files Secret Files and Origins Year 2000 special.

In a Final Crisis tie-in, Mr. Bones is seen as one of the fallen during a strike against Wonder Woman's Female Furies in Blüdhaven, with Count Vertigo and Negative Woman. He later survived the encounter as he is seen with Atom Smasher in a bar in Justice Society of America (vol. 2) #27 discussing the aforementioned incident and the latter's position on the team. When Rothstein leaves with other Society members, Bones is seen on the telephone calling the Global Peace Agency.

The New 52
In 2011, "The New 52" rebooted the DC universe. Mr. Bones is shown to be acting as the D.E.O.'s director and tasks agent Cameron Chase with capturing Batwoman. Bones now believes himself to be Col. Jacob Kane's illegitimate son. He captures Beth Kane, sister of Batwoman, and blackmails Batwoman into agreeing to uncover Batman secret identity. Batwoman, Col. Kane's "Murder of Crows" elite paramilitary group, and the heroine Hawkfire fail to rescue Beth. Agent Asaf, compromised by Hawkfire, shoots Bones in the head after he threatens to kill Beth rather than hand her over. Asaf later says Bones was mentally unbalanced, and is not Jacob Kane's son.

Infinite Frontier
In the pages of "Infinite Frontier", Mister Bones is talking to Cameron Chase about the recent events that have transpired since the events of "Dark Nights: Death Metal" that revealed the Multiverse to everyone. While on Earth Omega, Mister Bones was revealed to have shot down Cameron Chase ship and says that he made a deal with Darkseid to spare their Earth in exchange for others. Jade knocks down Mister Bones. After Darkseid has teleported all the heroes off of Earth Omega and back to their respectful Earths, Mister Bones was mentioned to have gotten away upon being returned to Prime-Earth.

Powers and abilities

Bones' mother's exposure to mutagenic drugs during pregnancy gave him three superhuman powers, two of which are extremely inconvenient to his daily life: superhuman strength; transparent skin, flesh, and organs that give him a skeleton-like appearance, and toxic, cyanide-like sweat.

Other versions
Mister Bones is featured in the Smallville Season 11 digital comic based on the TV series. During World War II, the man who would become Mister Bones was a member of, and presumably the leader of, a government task force codenamed "ShadowPact", created to counter the Axis Thule Society. Other members included Felix Faust and John Zatara, though the latter left the team after their first mission. At some point, Shadowpact came into contact with the Olympian god Hades, who promised them eternal youth if they aided him in escaping from the prison he had been sealed in by his brother, Zeus, and the queen of the Amazon tribe, Hippolyta. Bones could not fulfill his end of the bargain and was punished by the ancient deity, who used magic to turn Bones' skin, muscles and organs invisible and stain his bones black, giving the agent the appearance of a walking skeleton. In the present, Bones is the head of the government agency D.E.O. and uses a weekly treatment with body paint to appear normal and carry out day-to-day matters.

In other media
Mister Bones appears in Stargirl, voiced by Keith David. This version is the director of the Helix Institute for Youth Rehabilitation. After being alluded to in the episode "Summer School: Chapter Ten", his subordinate Nurse Louise Love informs him of Blue Valley's super-powered individuals and he makes plans to visit it in the episode "Summer School: Chapter Thirteen". In the episode "Frenemies – Chapter Eight: Infinity Inc. Part 2", he is visited by Courtney Whitmore, who convinces him to let Jennie-Lynn Hayden help her brother and Bones' patient Todd Rice. Following this and taking inspiration from the Justice Society of America, Bones becomes inspired to form a superhero team of his own.

References
Notes

Citations

DC Comics characters with superhuman strength
Fictional African-American people
DC Comics metahumans
Comics characters introduced in 1985
Characters created by Todd McFarlane
Characters created by Roy Thomas
Fictional skeletons